The Triennial of Photography (Triennale der Photographie) is a festival of photography in and around Hamburg, Germany. Originated as an initiative of photographer and collector F. C. Gundlach, currently director of Deichtorhallen Art Center, the Triennale takes place every third year since 1999.

The 4th Triennial of Photography Hamburg took place from the 11th to the 20th of April 2008. The 5th Triennial of Photography, Hamburg came up with numerous events at the festival tent and at five partaking cinemas from March 31 to April 6, 2011.

References

External links 

Photography festivals
Festivals in Hamburg
Photography in Germany
Recurring events established in 1999
1999 establishments in Germany
Tourist attractions in Hamburg
Art festivals in Germany